XHFG or Pulsar is a radio station in Tijuana, Baja California, Mexico, broadcasting in Spanish language. The station broadcasts and operates at 107.3 MHz with an ERP of 20 kW, XHFG is owned by Uniradio, which owns radio stations in Baja California and Sonora. XHFG has a US sales office in National City.

The station is primarily a Spanish Hot AC station.

XHFG-FM broadcasts in HD.

External links

References

1980 establishments in Mexico
Radio stations established in 1980
Radio stations in Tijuana
Spanish-language radio stations